James Baird (1802 in Old Monkland, Lanarkshire – 1876 in Cambusdoon) was a Scottish industrialist. He was the founder of the Baird Trust.

Life
He was born in the run-down farm of Kirkwood, near Old Monklands. He was the fourth of the eight sons (and two daughters) of Alexander Baird and Jean Moffat. After a farming beginning, he was inspired by the industrial revolution to begin to sink mine-shafts on the farm to dig for coal. At this stage, the company of William Baird & Co was formed. The family later set up the huge ironworks, Bairds of Gartsherrie. James focussed upon the iron processing industry.

Despite claims that it might damage the furnaces, from 1837 all furnaces were turned off on Sundays. This meant not only that it was a day of rest, but the whole atmosphere literally changed in the towns and villages.
By 1864, he had grown his blast furnaces to nearly fifty, producing 300,000 tons of iron annually, and employing 10,000 people. 

Throughout his life, he acquired land in Lanarkshire, Ayrshire and Fife, all for mining purposes. As the first Scot to introduce the chain-driven coal-cutters his companies had major advantages over his rivals who still dug by hand. Much of his money was returned to the community in terms of school-building and church-building.

From 1851 to 1857, he was an elected Tory Member of Parliament (MP) for the Falkirk Burghs. His brother William had had this seat just four years before. In 1857 he purchased the Knoydart estate as a quiet country retreat.

Baird was, while anti-union, very interested to give his workers education. He also donated £500,000 to support churches.

He died at his Ayrshire estate of Cambusdoon (formerly known as Greenfield), which he had acquired in 1852.

Baird Trust

Baird founded the Baird Trust, a charitable organization aimed at helping to fund church projects and spreading the word of the gospel. It funds both church extension projects, mission work and gives help to misters and their families. The original sum, a staggering £500,000 was overseen from 1873 by a board of trustees from the Church of Scotland including Rev Archibald Scott.

The Baird Lectures, begun in 1873, were part of the overall concept, promoting Scottish orthodoxy.

The Trust was restructured as a corporate body in 1939 by Act of Parliament.

The Trust was valued at £8 million in 2006. It annually pays out sums of £250,000 or more.

References

Attribution

"The Bairds of Gartsherrie"

External links 

 Biography at Glasgow Digital Library (visited 28 September 2009)
 Baird Trust website

1802 births
1876 deaths
19th-century Scottish businesspeople
British ironmasters
People from North Lanarkshire
Scottish philanthropists
Scottish educational theorists
Scottish Tory MPs (pre-1912)
UK MPs 1847–1852
UK MPs 1852–1857
Scottish Presbyterians
Deputy Lieutenants in Scotland
19th-century Scottish landowners
Politics of Falkirk (council area)
Members of the Parliament of the United Kingdom for Scottish constituencies